is a railway station on the Ainokaze Toyama Railway Line in the Fukuoka neighbourhood of the city of Takaoka, Toyama Prefecture, Japan, operated by the Ainokaze Toyama Railway, which is a third-sector operator. This station is named after Fukuoka, Toyama, not the city of Fukuoka in Kyushu, the main station of which is named Hakata.

Lines

Station layout 
Fukuoka Station has one side platform and one island platform connected by a footbridge. The station is staffed.

Platforms

History 
Fukuoka Station opened on 1 November 1898 as a station on the Japanese Government Railway (JGR). It was privatized on 1 April 1984, becoming a station on JR West.

From this date, Fukuoka Station was transferred to the ownership of the third-sector operating company Ainokaze Toyama Railway.

Adjacent stations

Passenger statistics
In fiscal 2015, the station was used by an average of 1,041 passengers daily (boarding passengers only).

Surrounding area
 Fukuoka high School

See also
 List of railway stations in Japan

References

External links

  

Railway stations in Toyama Prefecture
Railway stations in Japan opened in 1898
Ainokaze Toyama Railway Line
Takaoka, Toyama